is a Japanese manga series written and illustrated by Maiko Ogawa. It was serialized in Shogakukan's shōnen manga magazine Monthly Shōnen Sunday from March 2012 to September 2018.

Publication
Written and illustrated by Maiko Ogawa, Hitori Bocchi no Chikyū Shinryaku was serialized in Shogakukan's shōnen manga magazine Monthly Shōnen Sunday from March 12, 2012, to September 12, 2018. Shogakukan collected its chapters in fifteen tankōbon volumes, released from July 12, 2012, to November 12, 2018.

Volume list

References

Further reading

External links
 

Action anime and manga
Science fiction anime and manga
Shogakukan manga
Shōnen manga